Robert John Lansdown (2 January 1929 – 17 February 1999) was a British computer graphics pioneer, polymath and Professor Emeritus at Middlesex University Lansdown Centre for Electronic Arts, which was renamed in his honour in 2000.

Lansdown was born in Cardiff. As early as 1960, when he was a successful architect with offices in Russell Square, central London, Lansdown was a believer in the potential for computers for architecture and other creative activities. He pioneered the use of computers as an aid to planning; making perspective drawings on an Elliott 803 computer in 1963, modelling a building's lifts and services, plotting the annual fall of daylight across its site, as well as authoring his own computer aided design applications.

Lansdown joined the ACM in 1972 and Eurographics in 1983. From the early 1970s to the 1990s, he had influential roles in several professional bodies, and chaired the Science Research Council's Computer Aided Building Design Panel, through which he implemented a world leading strategy for developing computer aided architectural design in British universities. He had enormous influence as one of the founders and as secretary of the Computer Arts Society (1968–1991). He was on 10 editorial boards and chaired and organised many international conferences – Event One at the Royal College of Art (1969) and Interact at the Edinburgh Festival (1973) were seminal events in establishing the use of computers for the creation of art works.

In 1977, Lansdown became chairman of System Simulation Ltd the software company which, amongst other pioneering activities, had played a key role in the creation and development of the Computer Arts Society. System Simulation had been applying computer graphics techniques in TV and film applications following collaborative research work at the Royal College of Art. At System Simulation Lansdown then played a leading role in several pioneering animation projects, contributing to the flight deck instrumentation readouts on the Nostromo space ship for Ridley Scott's Alien, many advertising sequences and latterly, working with Tony Pritchett, producing the 3D wireframe drawings from which Martin Lambie-Nairn's original Channel 4 logo was rendered.

Lansdown left the architectural practice in 1982 and split his time between System Simulation and a Senior Research Fellowship at the Royal College of Art before becoming a full-time academic in 1988 as Professor and head of the Centre for Computer Aided Art & Design at Middlesex University, then as Dean of the Department of Art, Design and Performing Arts then, finally, as Pro Vice-Chancellor of the University. He was also Senior Visiting Fellow at the Department of Architectural Science, University of Sydney from 1983. He relinquished these roles on formal retirement in 1995, but continued to be very active and influential as Emeritus Professor in the Centre for Electronic Arts. He continued to advise System Simulation and to work on the development of a digital archive of the Computer Arts Society's history and holdings which the company had initiated. This was ended by his death but has since been brought up-to-date by the CACHe project in the School of Art History at Birkbeck, University of London.

Lansdown's range of publications began to diversify from the early 1970s. He wrote the classic Teach Yourself Computer Graphics (Hodder and Stoughton, 1987), exhibited algorithmically generated images, animations, compositions, conversations, sword fights and choreography, such as the 18-minute dance piece A/C/S/H/O commissioned by the One Extra Dance Company and performed at the Sydney Opera House in 1990. He contributed as author and/or editor to 34 books and worked on more than a hundred conference and journal publications.

Lansdown married Dorothy (Dot) in 1952, and they had two children, Robert and Karen. All survive him.

References

Bibliography
 Catherine Mason, a computer in the art room: the origins of british computer art 1950–1980. JJG Publishing, 2008. .
 Paul Brown, Charlie Gere, Nicholas Lambert, and Catherine Mason (editors), White Heat Cold Logic: British Computer Art 1960–1980. The MIT Press, Leonardo Book Series, 2008. .
 Charlie Gere, 'Minicomputer Experimentalism in the United Kingdom from the 1950s to 1980' in Hannah Higgins, & Douglas Kahn (Eds.), Mainframe experimentalism: Early digital computing in the experimental arts. Berkeley, CA: University of California Press (2012), pp. 114–116

External links
UNESCO page
SIGGRAPH biography

1929 births
1999 deaths
Scientists from Cardiff
Computer graphics professionals
Welsh computer scientists
Welsh computer programmers
Academics of Middlesex University
Academics of the Royal College of Art